Canarana marceloi is a species of beetle in the family Cerambycidae. It was described by Martins and Galileo in 1992. It is known from Bolivia, Brazil and Paraguay.

References

marceloi
Beetles described in 1992